The 1963 Boston College Eagles football team represented Boston College as an independent during the 1963 NCAA University Division football season. Led by second-year head coach Jim Miller, the Eagles compiled a record of 6–3. Boston College played home games at Alumni Stadium in Chestnut Hill, Massachusetts.
A historical note: The game slated to be played at Fenway Park on November 23 between BC and BU was cancelled because of the assassination of President Kennedy on the Friday before the scheduled game.

Schedule

References

Boston College
Boston College Eagles football seasons
Boston College Eagles football
1960s in Boston